Gaarder is a Norwegian surname. Notable people with the surname include:

Inger Margrethe Gaarder (1926–1993), Norwegian writer
Jon Atle Gaarder (born 1934), Norwegian diplomat
Jostein Gaarder (born 1952), Norwegian writer
Mikkel Gaarder, Norwegian Paralympic athlete
Ole P. Gaarder (1844-1927), American politician and farmer
Peder Krabbe Gaarder (1814–1883), Norwegian jurist and political theorist
Shabana Rehman Gaarder (born 1976), Norwegian comedian and writer
Torbjørn Gaarder (1885–1970), Norwegian chemist

Norwegian-language surnames